The Albright Bridge is a historic structure located south of Webster City, Iowa, United States. In April 1907 the Hamilton County Board of Supervisors contracted with A.H. Austin from Webster City to build the new bridge in Independence Township for $4,342. The Eastern Steel Company provided the steel. The Pratt through truss bridge was completed in early January 1908. The bridge was listed on the National Register of Historic Places in 1998.

References

Bridges completed in 1908
Transportation buildings and structures in Hamilton County, Iowa
Road bridges on the National Register of Historic Places in Iowa
Truss bridges in Iowa
National Register of Historic Places in Hamilton County, Iowa
1908 establishments in Iowa
Steel bridges in the United States